José Carlos dos Santos Saiani, also commonly known as José Carlos (born 11 April 1956) is a Brazilian former professional basketball player.

Career
During his pro club career, Saiani won the 1979 edition of the FIBA Intercontinental Cup, while a member of EC Sírio. With the senior Brazilian national basketball team, Saiani competed at the 1980 Summer Olympics.

References

1956 births
Living people
Basketball players at the 1980 Summer Olympics
Brazilian men's basketball players
Esporte Clube Sírio basketball players
Olympic basketball players of Brazil
Basketball players from São Paulo